David Kosse is a media executive and is currently the VP of international film for Netflix.

Career

Universal Pictures International 
Kosse served as president of Universal Pictures International until 2014, and during his 10 years at Universal, started and built Universal Pictures International, into an operation based in 16 countries, which grossed more than $2 billion at the box office in 2014 alone. Successful film releases under his tenure as president included Mamma Mia!, the Bourne films and Les Miserables, and acquisitions including Wolf of Wall Street, starring Leonardo DiCaprio.

Film4 
In November 2014, Kosse joined Film4 as director of its feature film division. During his time in the role, Film4 enjoyed its most successful awards season, with a record 15 Oscar nominations in 2015 which included Carol, Room, Ex Machina, 45 Years, Youth and Amy.

Netflix (2019–2022) 
In March 2019, it was announced that Kosse would join Netflix as vice president of international film, and was tasked to build the service’s international film offerings in Europe, Middle East and Africa "from ground zero." Since joining, he has overseen successful launches such as Paolo Sorrentino's Oscar-nominated The Hand of God, hitting the top 10 in 11 countries and Blood Red Sky, which reached and estimated 50 million households within 28 days of launching. With a focus upon establishing key relationships with big filmmakers, he has created a diverse slate that includes films from such acclaimed directors as J. A. Bayona, Jean-Pierre Jeunet, Louis Leterrier, Romain Gavras, Edward Berger, Roar Uthaug, Sébastian Lelio and Babak Anvari.

In December 2021, Kosse featured in Variety500, an index of the 500 most influential business leaders shaping the global media industry.

Kosse's departure from Netflix was announced in September 2022.

Filmography

As executive producer

As additional crew

Thanks

References 

Year of birth missing (living people)
Living people
American film studio executives
American businesspeople